Wray or Worai is the first month of the Afghan calendar. It has 31 days and starts with the beginning of the spring season (Gregorian March 21, but sometimes March 20).

Wray corresponds with the tropical Zodiac sign Aries. Wray literally means "lamb" in Pashto.

Events

Observances 
 Nauruz
 Easter Triduum - the three days before the first Sunday on or after the first full moon of Wray (Christian observance)
 Maundy Thursday - Thursday on or after the full moon of Wray (Christian observance)
 Good Friday - Friday on or after the full moon of Wray(Christian observance)
 Holy Saturday - Saturday on or full moon of Wray (Christian observance)
 Easter - the first Sunday on or after the first full moon of Wray (Christian observance)
 Baháʼí Naw-Rúz - 1 Wray (Baháʼí holiday)
 Opening Day - Thursday or Friday of the first or second week of Wray (movable, date set by Major League Baseball, falls on the Nauruz period)
 Pakistan Day - 3 Wray
 Feast of the Annunciation, Independence Day (Bangladesh) and Greek Independence Day - 5-6 Wray
 Qingming Festival - 15-17 Wray
 International Day of Sport for Development and Peace - 17 or 18 Wray
 Jackie Robinson Day and One Boston Day- 26 or 27 Wray

Pashto names for the months of the Solar Hijri calendar